The National Trust for Places of Historic Interest or Natural Beauty (informally known as the National Trust) owns or manages a range of properties in the ceremonial county of Somerset, England. These range from sites of Iron and Bronze Age occupations including Brean Down, Cadbury Camp and Cheddar Gorge to Elizabethan and Victorian era mansions, which include examples such as Montacute House and Tyntesfield. Some of the smaller properties include Coleridge Cottage and Stembridge Mill, the last remaining thatched windmill in England.

Somerset consists of a non-metropolitan county, administered by Somerset County Council, which is divided into five districts, and two unitary authorities. The districts of Somerset are West Somerset, South Somerset, Taunton Deane, Mendip and Sedgemoor. North Somerset and Bath and North East Somerset historically came under Somerset County Council. In 1974 they became part of county of Avon, and in 1996 they became administratively independent when Avon was broken up into unitary authorities.

Many of the buildings included in the list are listed buildings or scheduled monuments. Listed status refers to a building or other structure officially designated as being of special architectural, historical, or cultural significance; Grade I structures are those considered to be "buildings of exceptional interest". Listing was begun by a provision in the Town and Country Planning Act 1947. A scheduled monument is a "nationally important" archaeological site or historic building, given protection against unauthorised change. Scheduled Monuments are specified in the Ancient Monuments and Archaeological Areas Act 1979, which defines a monument as:

Properties

See also
 List of National Trust properties in England
 List of English Heritage properties in Somerset

References

External links

 
Lists of buildings and structures in Somerset